Ryan Quincy (born January 14, 1973, in Kearney, Nebraska, USA) is an American animator, voice actor, director, writer, and producer. He is known for his work on South Park, and was the creator of Out There on IFC and Future-Worm! on Disney XD.

Filmography
Mad TV (1995)
South Park (1999–2009)
Out There (2013) 
Pickle and Peanut (2015)
Future-Worm! (2016–2018)
Ten Year Old Tom (2021–present) - Co-Executive producer
Hunch Bunch (TBA) - Creator

References

External links

Living people
Animators from Nebraska
1973 births
American storyboard artists
American television writers
American male screenwriters
American male television writers
American television directors
American television producers
American animated film directors
American animated film producers
People from Kearney, Nebraska
American male voice actors
Screenwriters from Nebraska
Disney Television Animation people